Chesty may refer to:

Animals
 Chesty XII, mascot of the United States Marine Corps from 2002 to 2008
 Chesty XIII, mascot of the United States Marine Corps from 2008 to 2013
 Chesty XIV, mascot of the United States Marine Corps from 2013 to 2018
 Chesty XV, mascot of the United States Marine Corps

Arts
 Chesty Anderson, USN, a 1976 R-rated comedy film featuring Shari Eubank
 Chesty Morgan (band), a Swedish musical group named after the 1970s exploitation-film actress
 Chesty: A Tribute to a Legend, a documentary directed by John Ford and narrated by John Wayne

Characters
 Chesty, from the American animated short-lived television series Pandamonium
 Chesty Barlow, from the 1937 British drama film Cross My Heart
 Chesty Bond, long-lived fictional cartoon character and trademark for the Australian clothing company Bonds
 Chesty Burrage, from the 1935 American feature film Stolen Harmony
 Chesty Miller, from the 1940 American adventure film Emergency Squad
 Chesty Miller, from the 1960 gangster film The Music Box Kid
 "Chesty" Morgan, from the 1926 American romance film The Shamrock Handicap
 "Chesty" O'Connor, from the 1934 American romantic comedy film Here Comes the Navy
 Chesty Sanchez, fictional character and comic book superheroine created by Steve Ross
 Chesty Smith, from the 1992 American sports-drama film School Ties
 Chesty Webb, from the 1938 American comedy film Battle of Broadway

People
 Chet Johnson (also "Chesty Chet"; 1917–1983), Major League Baseball pitcher
 George W. McClusky (also Chesty McCluskey; 1861–1912), American law enforcement officer and police inspector
 Chesty Morgan (born 1937), Polish-born retired exotic dancer of Jewish descent
 Chesty Puller (1898–1971), United States Marine Corps officer
 Joie Ray (runner) (also "Chesty"; 1894–1978), American track and field athlete